The Christian (1914) is a silent film drama, directed by Frederick A. Thomson, and costarring Earle Williams and Edith Storey. The film is based on the novel The Christian by Hall Caine, published in 1897, the first British novel to reach the record of one million copies sold. The novel was adapted for the stage, opening on Broadway at the Knickerbocker Theatre 10 October 1898. This was the second film of the story; the first, The Christian (1911) was made in Australia.

Plot

John Storm decides to enter a monastery after his girlfriend Glory Quayle becomes a diva of London's stages. Not being able to forget Glory, John leaves the monastery to devote himself to the destitute and opens a refuge in the London slums. Glory, who has become his neighbour, tells him about her friend Polly who was pregnant by Lord Robert Ure, an aristocrat. As an unmarried mother Polly is disgraced and is dismissed from the hospital where she works as a nurse. John confronts Ure telling him to do his duty by marrying the girl. Ure, enraged by Storm's interference, marries Vera, a rich American woman. John publicly exposes Ure, but he takes his revenge by spreading the word that Storm makes catastrophic predictions and is announcing the end of the world on Derby Day. Riots break out in the slums. Glory manages to convince people that John is innocent of Ure's accusations. John and Glory decide to spend their lives together.

Production
The Christian was produced by the Vitagraph Company of America in association with the Liebler Company. It was the first eight reel film they made. Shooting was done in part at North Scituate in Rhode Island, at Winthrop Beach, in Massachusetts and in several places between Boston and Philadelphia. Frederick Stanhope, assistant to Frederick A. Thomson, was the theatrical director who had performed the Broadway work for Liebler Co. Viola Allen, the show's star, wanted to play Glory Quayle in the film, but Edith Storey wanted the role for herself. Caine wrote the film scenario, the first time ever that a famous author undertook a film scenario of their own work. Vitagraph staff writer Eugene Mullins followed Caine's scenario.

Distribution  
Distributed by the Vitagraph-Liebler Feature Film Company, The Christian was released in US cinemas on 16 March 1914. It premiered in New York at the Manhattan Opera House. Vitagraph leased the Harris Theatre on West 42nd Street, for the purpose of exclusively showing their own films, opening with The Christian.

A new edition of it was made in 1917 by the Greater Vitagraph (V-L-S-E, Incorporated).

Cast
 Edith Storey - Glory Quayle
 Carlotta De Felice - Polly Love
 Harry Northrup - Lord Robert Ure
 Donald Hall - Francis Horatio Drake
 Alberta Gallatin - Mrs. MacCrae, a wealthy American widow
 Jane Fearnley - Vera MacCrae, her daughter
 James Lackaye - Archdeacon Wealthy
 Charles Kent - Father Lamplugh
 Earle Williams - John Storm
 James Morrison - Brother Paul, Polly Love's brother
 Edward Kimball - Lord Storm, John Storm's father
 J. W. Sambrook - Parson Quayle

References

External links

 Review by Peter Milne

American silent feature films
Films based on British novels
Films based on multiple works
Films set in England
Films set in London
1914 films
American films based on plays
1914 drama films
Silent American drama films
American black-and-white films
Vitagraph Studios films
Films directed by Frederick A. Thomson
1910s American films